Karayel is a surname of Turkish origin, meaning "northwest wind". Notable people with the surname include:

Bekir Karayel (born 1982), Turkish middle and long-distance runner
Cebrail Karayel (born 1994), Turkish footballer
Emre Karayel (born 1972), Turkish actor and TV presenter
Fikri Karayel (born 1987), Turkish Cypriot rock singer and songwriter
Öykü Karayel (born 1990), Turkish actress

See also
Poyraz Karayel, Turkish drama television series
Vestel Karayel, a surveillance, reconnaissance, and combat unmanned aerial vehicle